Aisha Uqbah Malik (born 27 September 1982), also known by her name Aisha Khan, is a Pakistani former television and film actress. Her prominent roles include Mahgul from Khuda Mera Bhi Hai, Noor from Noor-e-Zindagi and Jeena from Mann Mayal.

Retirement
In March 2018, Khan announced her retirement from media industry, citing she had "moved onto the next phase of life".

Personal life
In April 2018, Khan married her fiancé Major Uqbah Hadeed Malik, through whom her mother-in-law is PTI MNA Asma Qadeer.

Filmography

Television

Films

See also
 List of Pakistani actresses

References

External links

Living people
1982 births
Pakistani film actresses
Pakistani television actresses
21st-century Pakistani actresses